Richard Lizurey is a French National Gendarmerie general. He has served as Director General (Chief of staff) since 1 September 2016.

Biography 
Born 5 November 1958 in Colmar, Richard Lizurey graduated from the French military academy and the French Gendarmerie nationale Officers School.

He successively served as platoon leader in Berlin (1981), gendarmerie mobile squadron commanding officer in Troyes (1985) and gendarmerie départementale company commander in Aubagne (1991).

In 1994, he became a project manager in the office of the Gendarmerie chief of staff.

Promoted to lieutenant colonel in 1997, he was posted to the French Ministry of Defence Cabinet, then became a technical advisor in the Cambodian Gendarmerie and finally a legal counselor in Kosovo.

He then served as the head of the Gendarmerie forces of the Haute-Garonne departement, based in Toulouse.

Promoted to colonel in 2002, he was the chief of the general affairs bureau in the office of the chief of staff of the French Gendarmerie.

After taking command of the Gendarmerie region of Corsica in 2007, he was promoted to brigadier-general the same year.

In 2009, he became counsellor in charge of security in the Cabinet of the French Interior ministry.

He became deputy chief of staff (with the rank of Major-General) in 2012 and was finally promoted to chief of staff in 2016 (with the rank of Army General)

Awards and decorations 

French Parachutist Badge
Grand Officer Légion d'honneur (2019)
Officer Ordre national du Mérite (2007)
Médaille de la Gendarmerie nationale with bronze palm
Médaille de la défense nationale, bronze grade
Médaille de la sécurité intérieure, gold grade
Médaille de reconnaissance de la Nation
Médaille commémorative française
Médaille d’or de l’Administration pénitentiaire
NATO Medal for Kosovo
Grand Cross Order of Merit of the Civil Guard (2017), Spain

Sources and references 

1958 births
Living people
French generals
Officers of the National Gendarmerie